Jacob Levitzki, also known as Yaakov Levitsky (17 August 1904 – 25 February 1956) was an Israeli mathematician.

Biography
Levitzki was born in 1904 in the Russian Empire and emigrated to then Ottoman-ruled Palestine in 1912. After completing his studies at the Herzliya Gymnasia, he travelled to Germany and, in 1929, obtained a doctorate in mathematics from the University of Göttingen under the supervision of Emmy Noether. In 1931, after two years at Yale University, in New Haven, Connecticut, Levitzki returned to Palestine to join the faculty at the Hebrew University of Jerusalem.

Awards
Levitzki together with Shimshon Amitsur, who had been one of his students at the Hebrew University, were each awarded the Israel Prize in exact sciences in 1953, the inaugural year of the prize, for their work on the laws of noncommutative rings.

Levitzki's son Alexander Levitzki, a recipient of the Israel Prize in 1990, in life sciences, established the Levitzki Prize in the name of his parents, Jacob and Charlotte, for Israeli research in the field of algebra.

See also

 List of Israel Prize recipients
 List of Jews born in the former Russian Empire
 Levitzki

References

1904 births
1956 deaths
Ukrainian Jews
Emigrants from the Russian Empire to the Ottoman Empire
Jews in Ottoman Palestine
Jews in Mandatory Palestine
20th-century Israeli Jews
20th-century Israeli mathematicians
Linear algebraists
Herzliya Hebrew Gymnasium alumni
University of Göttingen alumni
Yale University faculty
Academic staff of the Hebrew University of Jerusalem
Israel Prize in exact science recipients
Israel Prize in exact science recipients who were mathematicians